| tries = {{#expr:

 + 10 + 7  + 7 + 4 + 6  + 8  + 10 + 6  + 7  + 7
 + 7  + 5  + 6 + 4 + 10 + 8  + 12 + 8  + 7  + 3
 + 3  + 11 + 6 + 2 + 9  + 9  + 7  + 11 + 5  + 9
 + 6  + 9  + 3 + 1 + 6  + 13 + 12 + 6  + 5  + 8
 + 8  + 11 + 3 + 3 + 10 + 8  + 6  + 9  + 7  + 5
 + 8  + 7  + 5 + 7 + 7  + 7  + 6  + 5  + 10 + 6
 + 5 + 8 + 8 + 2 
 + 5 + 2
 + 6
}}
| top point scorer = Jack Carty (Connacht)Jarrod Evans (Cardiff Blues)(56 points)
| top try scorer = Adam Radwan (Newcastle Falcons)(10 tries)
| venue               = San Mamés Stadium, Bilbao
| attendance2         = 
| champions           =  Cardiff Blues
| count               = 2
| runner-up           =  Gloucester
| website             = EPCR Website
| previous year       = 2016–17
| previous tournament = 2016–17 European Rugby Challenge Cup
| next year           = 2018–19
| next tournament     = 2018–19 European Rugby Challenge Cup
}}

The 2017–18 European Rugby Challenge Cup was the fourth edition of the European Rugby Challenge Cup, an annual second-tier rugby union competition for professional clubs. It was also the 22nd season of the Challenge Cup competition in all forms, following on from the now defunct European Challenge Cup. Clubs from six European nations plus two Russian club will competed for the title.

The first round of the group stage began on the weekend of 12/13/14/15 October 2017, and the competition ended with the final on 11 May 2018 in Bilbao, Spain. This was the first time the final has been held outside one of the Six Nations countries.

French side Stade Français were the reigning champions but failed to progress past the quarter-finals after losing to Newcastle Falcons. Gloucester returned to the final having lost to Stade Français last season, where they faced Cardiff Blues, who made it their first final of any competition since their 2010 European Challenge Cup Final victory. Like then, Cardiff Blues were victorious, defeating Gloucester 31–30 with a 78th-minute penalty by Gareth Anscombe to clinch the title.

Teams
20 teams qualified for the 2017–18 European Rugby Challenge Cup; a total of 18 qualified from across the Premiership, Pro14 and Top 14, as a direct result of their domestic league performance, with two coming through a play-off. The expected distribution of teams is:
 England: 5 clubs
 Any teams finishing between 8th-11th position in the Aviva Premiership. (4 Teams)
 The winner of the Greene King IPA Championship, London Irish. (1 Team)
 France: 8 clubs
 Any teams finishing between 8th-12th position in the Top 14. (5 Teams)
 The champion, Oyonnax and the winner of the promotion play-off, Agen, from the Pro D2. (2 Teams)
 There will be an eighth team from France, as the French representative in the Champions Cup play-off (Stade Français) did not qualify for the 2017–18 European Rugby Champions Cup. (1 Team)
 Ireland, Italy, Scotland & Wales: 5 clubs
 Any teams that did not qualify for the European Rugby Champions Cup, or the play-off, through the Guinness Pro12. (3 teams)
 Two sides (Wales' Cardiff Blues, and Ireland's Connacht), having lost during the play-off semi-finals. (2 Teams)
 Russia: 2 clubs
 Two Russian teams qualified through the 2016–17 Continental Shield, which took place alongside the Challenge Cup and Champions Cup competitions.

The following clubs qualified for the Challenge Cup.

20th team play-off

Four clubs competed in a play-off to decide the final team in the Champions Cup. The play-off comprised three matches, contested by one team from the Premiership, one from the Top 14, and two from the Pro14.

The two Pro12 teams each played one of the Premiership or Top 14 sides in a single-leg semi-final, held at the home ground of the non-Pro12 side. The winners of these matches then contested a play-off final, with the winner of this match competing in the 2017–18 European Rugby Champions Cup. The three losing teams were all entered in the Challenge Cup.

The following teams took part:

Matches
A draw was held on 15 March 2017 to determine the two semi-final matches, and which semi-final's winner would have home advantage in the final.

Semi-finals

Play-off final

Continental Shield

Eight teams were split into two pools of four to compete in the re-branded European Rugby Continental Shield. Each team played the four teams in the other pool once. The winner of each pool then played a two-legged final against last year's qualifying sides, and the winners, on aggregate, will take the two remaining places in the Challenge Cup.

Play-offs

 Enisey-STM beat Mogliano 97 – 7 on aggregate.

 Krasny Yar beat Timișoara Saracens 39 – 35 on aggregate.

Team details
Below is the list of coaches, captain and stadiums with their method of qualification for each team.

Note: Placing shown in brackets, denotes standing at the end of the regular season for their respective leagues, with their end of season positioning shown through CH for Champions, RU for Runner-up, SF for losing Semi-finalist and QF for losing Quarter-finalist.

Seeding
The 20 competing teams were seeded and split into four tiers; seeding was based on performance in their respective domestic leagues. Where promotion and relegation is in effect in a league, the promoted team was seeded last, or (if multiple teams are promoted) by performance in the lower competition.

Teams will be taken from a league in order of rank and put into a tier. A draw was used to allocate two second seeds to Tier 1; the remaining team went into Tier 2. This allocation indirectly determined which fourth-seeded team entered Tier 2, while the others entered Tier 3.

Given the nature of the Continental Shield, a competition including developing rugby nations and Italian clubs not competing in the Pro12, qualifying teams are automatically included in Tier 4, and are, in effect, seeded equally despite officially being ranked 1/2 from that competition.

The brackets show each team's seeding and their league (for example, 1 Top 14 indicates the team was seeded 1st from the Top 14).

Pool stage

The draw took place on 8 June 2017, in Neuchâtel, Switzerland.

Teams in the same pool play each other twice, both at home and away in the group stage, beginning on the weekend of 12/13/14 October 2017, and continuing through to 19/20 January 2018, before the pool winners and three best runners-up progressed to the quarter finals.

Teams are awarded competition points, based on match result. Teams receive 4 points for a win, 2 points for a draw, 1 attacking bonus point for scoring four or more tries in a match and 1 defensive bonus point for losing a match by seven points or fewer.

In the event of a tie between two or more teams, the following tie-breakers will be used, as directed by EPCR:
 Where teams have played each other
 The club with the greater number of competition points from only matches involving tied teams.
 If equal, the club with the best aggregate points difference from those matches.
 If equal, the club that scored the most tries in those matches.
 Where teams remain tied and/or have not played each other in the competition (i.e. are from different pools)
 The club with the best aggregate points difference from the pool stage.
 If equal, the club that scored the most tries in the pool stage.
 If equal, the club with the fewest players suspended in the pool stage.
 If equal, the drawing of lots will determine a club's ranking.

Pool 1

Pool 2

Pool 3

Pool 4

Pool 5

Ranking of pool leaders and runners-up

Knock-out stage

Format
The eight qualifiers are ranked according to their performance in the pool stage and compete in the quarter-finals which will be held on the weekend of 30/31 March 2018. The four top teams will host the quarter-finals against the four lower teams in a 1v8, 2v7, 3v6 and 4v5 format.

The semi-finals will played on the weekend of 20/21/22 April 2018. In lieu of the draw that used to determine the semi-final pairing, EPCR announced that a fixed semi-final bracket would be set in advance, and that the home team would be designated based on "performances by clubs during the pool stages as well as the achievement of a winning a quarter-final match away from home".

Home advantage will be awarded as follows:

Bracket

Quarter-finals

Semi-finals

Final

Attendances
 Does not include the attendance at the final as it takes place at a neutral venue.

See also
2017–18 European Rugby Champions Cup
2017–18 European Rugby Continental Shield

Notes

References

 
2017-18
2017–18 rugby union tournaments for clubs
2017–18 in European rugby union
2017–18 in English rugby union
2017–18 in French rugby union
2017–18 in Irish rugby union
2017–18 in Italian rugby union
2017–18 in Scottish rugby union
2017–18 in Welsh rugby union
2017 in Russian rugby union
2018 in Russian rugby union